Giorgio Calz (20 July 1900 – 31 March 1970) was an Italian wrestler. He competed in the Greco-Roman heavyweight event at the 1920 Summer Olympics.

References

External links
 

1900 births
1970 deaths
Olympic wrestlers of Italy
Wrestlers at the 1920 Summer Olympics
Italian male sport wrestlers
Sportspeople from Trieste